KLGD is an FM radio station licensed to Stamford, Texas that serves the Abilene, Texas area with Classic Country music. The KLGD studio is located in Abilene, and the transmitter is located west of Stamford in northern Jones County.

External links 
 Official website
 

LGD
Radio stations established in 2004
2004 establishments in Texas